The Legislative Assembly of Andhra Pradesh currently has 175 constituencies out of which 29 constituencies are reserved for Scheduled Castes candidates and 7 constituencies are reserved for Scheduled tribes candidates.

District-wise summary

List of current constituencies 
The below is a list of constituencies of Andhra Pradesh Legislative Assembly.

List of former constituencies 
Pradesh Legislative Assembly#Proposed merge of List of former constituencies of the Andhra Pradesh Legislative Assembly into List of constituencies of the Andhra Pradesh Legislative Assembly|date=May 2022}}
This is a list of former constituencies of the Legislative Assembly of Andhra Pradesh, organised by distrcit eise. It does not include constituencies which were merely renamed.

Constituencies abolished in 2008
The most recent Delimitation Commission was constituted on July 12, 2002. The recommendations of the commission were approved by the Presidential notification on February 19, 2008. The Andhra Pradesh Legislative Assembly constituencies, abolished as a result were as follows:

Anantapur
Nallamada constituency
Gorantla constituency
Gooty constituency

Chittoor
Puttur constituency
Vepanjeri constituency
Vayalpad constituency

East Godavari
Yellavaram constituency (ST)
Burugupudi constituency
Kadiam constituency
Sampara constituency
Tallarevu constituency
Alamuru constituency
Allavaram constituency (SC)
Nagaram constituency (SC)

Guntur
Kuchinapudi constituency
Duggirala constituency

Krishna
Kankipadu constituency
Vuyyur constituency
Mudinepalli constituency
Malleswaram constituency
Nidumolu assembly constituency (SC)

Kurnool
Koilkuntla constituency
Atmakur constituency

Prakasam
Martur constituency
Cumbum constituency

Sri Potti Sriramulu Nellore
Allur constituency
Rapur constituency

Srikakulam
Sompeta constituency
Harishchandrapuram constituency
Kothuru constituency (ST)
Vunkuru constituency

Visakhapatnam
Paravada constituency
Chintapalli constituency (ST)

Vizianagaram
Naguru constituency (ST)
Therlam constituency
Sathivada constituency
Bhogapuram constituency
Uttarapalli constituency

West Godavari
Penugonda constituency
Attili constituency

YSR
Lakkireddipalli constituency

See also 
List of former constituencies of the Andhra Pradesh Legislative Assembly
Lok Sabha constituencies of Andhra Pradesh
Andhra Pradesh State Assembly

References

External links 
Election Commissioner of India

Constituencies, Vidan Sabha
A